Tina Maharath (born November 30, 1990) is an American politician who served as an Ohio State Senator from the 3rd District from 2019 until 2023. She also served in the Senate Democrats leadership team as Minority Whip.

As a Democrat, Maharath won election to the Senate in a highly close race with Republican opponent Anne Gonzales, flipping the 3rd Senate District from the Republicans. Maharath's victory represented the first time Ohio Democrats had won a Republican held State Senate seat since 2006. Maharath is also notable for being the first Asian-American woman in the Ohio Senate and the first Laotian-American elected into public office.

Maharath is from Whitehall, Ohio, the daughter of Laotian refugees. Her father served the U.S. Army under the Laos Army while her mother worked as a nurse in the Laos Army.  Maharath is a third-generation politician, and the first woman to hold office in her family. Maharath has a Bachelor's degree in political science and a Master's degree in Law, Justice and Culture from Ohio University.

Ohio State Senate 
In 2018, Maharath was elected to the Ohio State Senate. During her time in the Senate she sponsored legislation that would prohibit conversion therapy for minors, create an Asian-American and Pacific Islander Affairs Commission, and designate Maternal Mortality Awareness Month.

During her time in the Senate, she had been elected by her fellow Democratic colleagues to their leadership team as Assistant Minority Whip then Minority Whip. In the 2022 election, Maharath lost to Republican Michele Reynolds.

Committee assignments 

 Committee on Financial Institutions and Technology (Ranking Member)
 Local Government and Elections (Ranking Member)
 Agriculture and Natural Resources
 Insurance
Rules and Reference
Transportation

Committees served under the 133rd General Assembly: 
 Local Government, Veterans Affair, Public Safety (Ranking Member) 
 Higher Education 
 Transportation, Commerce and Workforce 
 Health, Human Services and Medicaid 
 Education 
 Agriculture and Natural Resources

Electoral history

References

Living people
Democratic Party Ohio state senators
Women state legislators in Ohio
Asian-American people in Ohio politics
American people of Laotian descent
Ohio University alumni
21st-century American women politicians
21st-century American politicians
People from Franklin County, Ohio
1990 births